Leslie Howard Golledge (3 August 1911 – 19 July 1989) was a professional footballer who played as a centre forward, inside forward and right half in The Football League for Bristol City and Bristol Rovers in the 1930s.

Golledge joined Bristol City as an amateur in 1930, turning professional a year later, where he played 25 times and scored three goals in the football league. Following a trial with Rovers in 1934 he joined them as an amateur, playing mostly for their reserve team. He won two Western League championships with the reserves, and made nine first team appearances, scoring a single goal. He ended his time with Rovers playing for the 'A' team (the third team), and later had a spell playing for Lincoln City's reserves.

Despite his small number of appearances, Golledge holds a place in the Bristol Rovers history books as his only goal for them was their 1000th goal in league football.

References

1911 births
1989 deaths
People from Chipping Sodbury
English footballers
Association football forwards
Bristol City F.C. players
Bristol Rovers F.C. players
English Football League players
Western Football League players
Lincoln City F.C. players
Footballers from Gloucestershire